Jowasa Drodrolagi (born 12 April 1995) is a Fijian professional rugby league footballer who plays as a  and  for AS Carcassonne in the Elite One Championship and Fiji at international level.

Background
He was born in Ekubu, Vatulele, Fiji.

Drodrolagi played for the Nabua Broncos as a junior.

Club career
He played for the Fiji Residents side whilst still in school. 

Drodrolagi also played for the Glebe Dirty Reds in the Ron Massey Cup and the Newtown Jets and the Western Suburbs Magpies in the New South Wales Cup. 

He joined the newly created from Kaiviti Silktails in the Ron Massey Cup. 

Drodrolagi was contracted to Whitehaven on a short-term contract in 2022.

International career
Drodrolagi was named in Fiji Bati squads as far back as 2016.

In October 2022 Drodrolagi was named in the Fiji squad for the 2021 Rugby League World Cup.

He was named in the match-day squad to play against Australia in Fiji's opening match of the World Cup at Emerald Headingley Stadium in Leeds.

References

External links
Rakaviti profile
Fiji profile

1995 births
Living people
AS Carcassonne players
Fiji national rugby league team players
Fijian rugby league players
Newtown Jets players
Rugby league locks
Western Suburbs Magpies players